The Bristol Fighter is a sports car produced by Bristol Cars in small numbers from 2004 until the company suspended manufacturing in 2011. It is generally classed as a supercar.

The coupé body, which features gullwing doors, was designed by former Brabham Formula One engineer Max Boxstrom  and gives the car a Cd of 0.28. 

This is in keeping with Bristol's use of Chrysler engines since 1961. In the more powerful Fighter S, the engine is tuned to produce 628 hp (660 hp at high speed using the ram air effect).

The car has a six-speed manual or four-speed automatic transmission, and is rear-wheel drive.

Although sketches and models had been publicized some time before, a complete car was first shown to the press in May 2003. The first drive by a car magazine appears to be that in the April 2005 issue of Evo magazine.

It is not known exactly how many Bristol Fighters were manufactured, but the number is between 9 and 14.

Fighter T
In 2006, Bristol announced the Fighter T, a turbocharged version of the Fighter. This also would have made it the first turbocharged petrol-powered V10 production car. The Fighter T was designed to have an improved drag coefficient of 0.27.

The Bristol Cars website now states that in fact, no Bristol Fighter T's were ever produced "... (the planned turbo version with 1050bhp never did make it to production)... "

Specifications

References

External links
 Bristol Cars: Fighter
 Bristol Owners Club, Bristol Fighter
 Autocar review
 Top Gear: Bristol Fighter T preview

Fighter (car)
Rear-wheel-drive vehicles
Coupés
Cars introduced in 2004
Automobiles with gull-wing doors
Grand tourers
2010s cars